Two submarines of the French Navy have borne the name Sultane or La Sultane:

 , an  launched in 1932 and sold for scrap in 1946
 , a  formerly HMS Statesman in French service from 1952 to 1959

French Navy ship names